Gajret was a cultural society established in 1903 that promoted Serb identity among the Slavic Muslims of Austria-Hungary (today's Bosnia and Herzegovina). After 1929, it was known as the Serb  Muslim Cultural Society. The organization was pro-Serb.

History 
After the 1914 Assassination of Archduke Franz Ferdinand leadership of the association was interned in Arad.

The organization viewed that the South-Slavic Muslims were Serbs lacking ethnic consciousness. The view that South-Slavic Muslims were Serbs is probably the oldest of three ethnic theories among the Bosnian Muslims themselves. After the Austro-Hungarian occupation of Bosnia and Herzegovina, the Bosnian Muslims, feeling threatened by Catholic Habsburg rule, established several organizations. These included, apart from Gajret, the Muslim National Organization (1906) and the United Muslim Organization (1911). In 1912, after the death of Osman Đikić, the editing of Gajret was entrusted to Avdo Sumbul.

Gajret's main rival was the pro-Croat Muslim organization Narodna Uzdanica, established in 1924. In interwar Yugoslavia, members experienced persecution at the hands of non-Serbs due to their political inclinations. In this period association run a number of student dormitories in Mostar, Sarajevo, Belgrade and Novi Pazar.

During World War II, the association was dismantled by the Independent State of Croatia. Some members, non-Communists, joined or collaborated with the Yugoslav Partisans (such as M. Sudžuka, Z. Šarac, H. Brkić, H. Ćemerlić, and M. Zaimović). Ismet Popovac and Fehim Musakadić joined the Chetniks.

In 1945, a new Muslim organization, Preporod, was founded in order to replace the pro-Serb Gajret and pro-Croat Narodna Uzdanica. The former organizations voted for and were merged into Preporod. In 1996 it was reestablished as a Bosniak cultural association.

Notable members
Osman Đikić (founder)
Safvet-beg Bašagić (founder)
Edhem Mulabdić (founder)
Avdo Sumbul
Osman Nuri Hadžić
Ismet Popovac
Fehim Musakadić
Muhamed Sudžuka
Zaim Šarac
Husein Brkić
Hamdija Ćemerlić
Murat-beg Zaimović

See also
Prosvjeta (1902)

References

Sources

Bosniak history
Bosnia and Herzegovina Muslims
Yugoslav Bosnia and Herzegovina
Ethnic organizations based in Yugoslavia
Ethnic organizations based in Austria-Hungary
Organizations established in 1903
1903 establishments in Austria-Hungary
1900s establishments in Bosnia and Herzegovina
1941 disestablishments in Europe